The Greater Farallones National Marine Sanctuary (formerly Gulf of the Farallones National Marine Sanctuary) protects the wildlife, habitats, and cultural resources of one of the most diverse and bountiful marine environments in the world, an area of 3,295 square miles off the northern and central California coast. The waters within Greater Farallones National Marine Sanctuary are part of a nationally significant marine ecosystem, and support an abundance of life, including many threatened or endangered species.

About
In 1972, in response to a growing awareness of the value of the coastal waters of the United States, the United States Congress passed the National Marine Sanctuaries Act. The Act authorized the designation of National Marine Sanctuaries to protect significant waters and secure habitat for aquatic species, shelter historically significant shipwrecks and other cultural resources, and serve as valuable spots for research, fishing, wildlife viewing, boating, and tourism.

Designated in 1981, Gulf of the Farallones National Marine Sanctuary (GFNMS) spanned 1,279-square-miles (966 square nautical miles) just north and west of San Francisco Bay, and protected open ocean, nearshore tidal flats, rocky intertidal areas, estuarine wetlands, subtidal reefs, and coastal beaches within its boundaries. In 2015, GFNMSexpanded north and west of their original boundaries to encompass 3,295 square miles, and changed their name to Greater Farallones National Marine Sanctuary. GFNMS has administrative jurisdiction over the northern portion of the Monterey Bay National Marine Sanctuary, from the San Mateo/Santa Cruz County line northward to the existing boundary between the two sanctuaries. GFNMS maintains an administrative office and public Visitor Center on Crissy Field in the Presidio of San Francisco.

GFNMS is located within the California Current ecosystem, one of four major eastern boundary currents in the world, that stretches along the western coast of North America from southern Canada to northern Mexico. Due to a high degree of wind-driven upwelling, there is a ready supply of nutrients to surface waters and the California Current ecosystem is one of the most biologically productive regions in the world.

GFNMS is a globally significant, extraordinarily diverse, and productive marine ecosystem that supports abundant wildlife and valuable fisheries. It provides breeding and feeding grounds for at least twenty-five endangered or threatened species; thirty-six marine mammal species, including blue, gray, and humpback whales, harbor seals, elephant seals, Pacific white-sided dolphins, and one of the southernmost U.S. populations of threatened Steller sea lions; over a quarter-million breeding seabirds; and one of the most significant white shark populations on the planet.

GFNMS adjoins two other National Marine Sanctuaries, Monterey Bay National Marine Sanctuary and Cordell Bank National Marine Sanctuary. It comprises part of the United Nations' Golden Gate Biosphere Reserve.  Within the sanctuary are the Farallon Islands and associated National Wildlife Refuge.

References

External links
Greater Farallones National Marine Sanctuary
Greater Farallones Association (GFA)

Further reading
 Beyond the Golden Gate: Oceanography, Oceanography, Geology, Biology, and Environmental Issues in the Gulf of the Farallones. (2000). Edited by Herman A. Karl, John L. Chin, Edward Ueber, Peter H. Stauffer, and James W. Hendley II.  U.S. Geological Survey, Circular 1198. Online at biodiversitylibrary.org.

National Marine Sanctuaries of the United States
Marine sanctuaries in California
Protected areas of Marin County, California
Protected areas of San Francisco
Protected areas of the San Francisco Bay Area
Natural history of San Francisco
Natural history of Marin County, California
Natural history of the San Francisco Bay Area
1981 establishments in California
Protected areas established in 1981